Nakasongola is a town in Nakasongola District in the Central Region of Uganda. The town is the site of the district headquarters.

Location
The coordinates of the town are 1°18'54.0"N, 32°27'54.0"E (Latitude:1.3150; Longitude:32.4650).

Population
The population of Nakasongola Town was estimated at 6,500 during the 2002 national census. In 2006, the population was estimated at 6,920. In the 2014 national population census and household survey, the population of Nakasongola was enumerated at 10,289.

In 2015, Uganda Bureau of Statistics (UBOS) estimated the town's population at 10,100. In 2020, the population agency estimated the mid-year population of Nakasongola Town at 11,700 people, of whom 6,200 (53 percent) were male and 5,500 (47 percent) were female. UBOS calculated the population growth rate of the town to average 2.98 percent per year, between 2015 and 2020.

Points of interest

See also
List of military schools in Uganda
List of airports in Uganda
List of cities and towns in Uganda

References

External links
Works On Nakasongola UPDF Air Base Begin

Populated places in Central Region, Uganda
Cities in the Great Rift Valley
Nakasongola District